Charles W. Whittington, Jr. was a major general in the United States Army. As of July 2018, he was serving as deputy director of the United States Army National Guard. Whittington previously served as the First Army deputy commanding general-operations.

Early life and education
Whittington is a native of Birmingham, Alabama. He graduated from the University of Southern Mississippi in 1986 with a BS degree in political science. He joined Tau Kappa Epsilon during his time at Southern Mississippi. Whittington was commissioned via ROTC in December 1986 as a field artillery officer.  Whittington later received a master of strategic studies degree from the United States Army War College.

Military career
General Whittington began his military service when he was commissioned in December 1986 as an artillery officer in the Regular Army, through the University of Southern Mississippi, Reserve Officer Training Corps.

After commissioning, he served in Germany and as a field artillery instructor at Fort Sill, Oklahoma. During Operation Desert Storm, he served in Kuwait and Iraq as a battery executive officer. Since joining the Maryland National Guard in 1993, he has commanded and held staff assignments at the battery, battalion and brigade levels.

In March 2007, Whittington deployed to Camp Victory, Iraq as deputy commander, 58th Infantry Brigade Combat Team. In June 2008, he assumed command of the 58th Infantry Brigade Combat Team and oversaw the Brigade's transformation into the 58th Battlefield Surveillance Brigade. General Whittington served as deputy commander, 29th Infantry Division in June 2010. He served in Kabul, Afghanistan as director, Afghan National Security Forces Development/ International Security Assistance Force from September 2011 to July 2012. He led a joint multicultural team tasked with developing and implementing key initiatives to facilitate the growth and development of the Afghan National Security Forces.

Whittington was named First Army deputy commanding general for operations on Aug. 26, 2015. He assumed the post of deputy director of the U.S. Army National Guard on July 1, 2018.

Civilian career
He is currently Senior Vice President, Integration for Pactiv Corporation in Lake Forest, Illinois.

Assignments
 October 1987 – March 1988, student, Field Artillery School, Fort Sill, Oklahoma
 March 1988 – December 1988, company fire support officer, 4–67 Armor, Ray Barracks, Friedburg, Germany
 December 1988 – December 1989, executive officer, Service Battery, 2-82d Field Artillery A (155SP), Ray Barracks, Friedburg, Germany
 December 1989 – September 1990, adjutant, 2-82d Field Artillery Battalion, Ray Barracks, Friedburg, Germany
 September 1990 – July 1991, executive officer, Battery A, 2-82d Field Artillery, Basara, Iraq
 July 1991 – September 1992, instructor, Field Artillery School, Fort Sill, Oklahoma
 September 1992 – October 1993, United States Army Reserve Control Group
 October 1993 – January 1995, brigade targeting officer, 2–110 Field Artillery Battalion, Pikesville, Maryland
 January 1995 – November 1997, commander, Battery B / 2-110 Field Artillery Battalion, Pikesville, Maryland
 November 1997 – July 1998, plans officer, 2–110 Field Artillery Battalion, Pikesville
 July 1998 – January 2002, operations officer, 2–110 Field Artillery Battalion, Pikesville, Maryland
 January 2002 – August 2003, executive officer, 2–110 Field Artillery Battalion, Pikesville, Maryland
 August 2003 – April 2006, commander, 2–110 Field Artillery Battalion, Pikesville, Maryland
 April 2006 to March 2007, commander, 291 Army Liaison Team, Laurel, Maryland
 March 2007 – May 2008, deputy commander, 58th Infantry Brigade Combat Team, Camp Victory, Iraq
 June 2008 – June 2010, commander, 58th Infantry Brigade Combat Team, Towson, Maryland
 June 2010 – September 2012, deputy commander, 29th Infantry Division, Towson, Maryland
 October 2012 – August 2015, commander, 29th Infantry Division, Fort Belvoir, Virginia 
 August 2015 – July 2018, deputy commanding general (RC), First United States Army, Rock Island, Illinois
 July 2018 – February 2019, deputy director, Army National Guard, Arlington, Virginia
 March 2019 – June 2019, acting director, Army National Guard
 June 2019 – July 2019, deputy director, Army National Guard, Arlington, Virginia

Awards and decorations
Whittington's awards and decorations include:

Effective dates of promotion
 Second lieutenant 19 December 1986
 First lieutenant 19 December 1988
 Captain 1 May 1992
 Major 26 October 1993
 Lieutenant colonel 5 November 2003
 Colonel 29 March 2007
 Brigadier general 1 October 2010
 Major general 7 October 2012

References

External links

Living people
University of Southern Mississippi alumni
United States Army War College alumni
United States Army generals
Recipients of the Legion of Merit
Year of birth missing (living people)